Approximately twenty-seven statues of Gudea, a ruler (ensi) of the state of Lagash have been found in southern Mesopotamia. Gudea ruled between c. 2144–2124 BC and the statues demonstrate a very sophisticated level of craftsmanship for the time. The known statues have been categorised 'A-AB' by archaeologists.  Many statues are headless, and there are also detached heads.  Gudea is named in the dedicatory inscription carved on most statues, but in somes cases the identity of the ruler portrayed is uncertain.

Provenance
Statues A-K were found during Ernest de Sarzec's excavations in the court of the palace of Adad-nadin-ahhe in Telloh (ancient Girsu). Statues M-Q come from clandestine excavations in Telloh in 1924; the rest come from the art trade, with unknown provenances and sometimes of doubtful authenticity. Figures L and R do not represent Gudea with reasonable certainty.

Description and purpose
The statues were to represent the ruler in temples, to offer a constant prayer in his stead; offerings were made to these. Most of the statues bear an inscribed dedication explaining to which god it was dedicated. Gudea is either sitting or standing; in one case (N), he holds a water-jug au vase jaillissant. He normally wears a close fitting kaunakes, maybe made of sheep-skin, and a long tasseled dress. Only in one example (M, Soclet-statue) he wears a different dress, reminiscent of the Akkadian royal costume (torso of Manishtushu). On the lap of one of them (statue B) is the plan of his palace, with the scale of measurement attached. Statue F is similar to statue B; both are missing their heads, and have on their lap a board with a measuring scale and a stylus, only statue F doesn't have a ground plan.

Size and material
It seems that the early statues are small and made of more local stones (limestone, steatite and redstone); later, when wide-ranging trade-connections had been established, the more costly exotic diorite was used.  Unlike the local stone, diorite is extremely hard, and so difficult to carve.  Diorite had already been used by old Sumerian rulers (Statue of Entemena). According to the inscriptions, the diorite ('diorite or gabbro') came from Magan. The remnants of a very large diorite statue in the British Museum may be a representation of Gudea, but this cannot be determined with certainty. What remains of the statue is 1.5 metres high (and weighs over 1250 kg), meaning that if it were fully reconstructed the statue would be well over 3 metres high and the largest yet discovered sculpture of the ruler.

Dedicatory inscription
The dedication of the diorite statues normally tell how ensi Gudea had diorite brought from the mountains of Magan, formed it as a statue of himself, called by name to honour god/goddess (x) and had the statue brought into the temple of (y). Most of the big (almost lifesize, D is even bigger than life) statues are dedicated to the top gods of Lagash: Ningirsu, his wife Ba'u, the goddesses Gatumdu and Inanna and Ninhursanga as the "Mother of the gods". Q is dedicated to Ningiszida, Gudea's personal protective deity more properly connected to rand Abu Salabikh, the smaller M, N and O to his "wife" Gestinanna. The connection between Ningiszida and Gestinanna was probably invented by Archaeologists in order to effect a closer connection to Lagash.

Table of statues

Further reading
 Dietz Otto Edzard, "Gudea and His Dynasty" Royal Inscriptions of Mesopotamia Early Periods - RIME  3/1 (Toronto University Press 1997).
 F. Johansen, "Statues of Gudea, ancient and modern". Mesopotamia 6, 1978.
 A. Parrot, Tello, vingt campagnes des fouilles (1877-1933). (Paris 1948).
 H. Steible, "Versuch einer Chronologie der Statuen des Gudea von Lagas". Mitteilungen der Deutschen Orient-Gesellschaft 126 (1994), 81-104.

References

External links

 Photographs of the Gudea statues at Louvre Insecula.com
 Statue M The Detroit Institute of Arts
  The true face of Gudea. A realistic statue of Gudea shows us how he may have looked in real life. 

Sumerian art and architecture
Sculpture of the Ancient Near East
Dhi Qar Governorate